The Second Field Army (第二野战军), initially known as the Central Plains Field Army (中原野战军) or the Liu-Deng Army, was a major military formation of the Chinese Communist Party during the last stages of the Chinese Civil War.

The Second Field Army took control of PLA troops in central China, with Liu Bocheng as commander and Deng Xiaoping as commissar. It comprised three armies: the 3rd Army (10th, 11th Corps, and 12th Corps) 4th Army (13th, 14th, and 15th Corps), and 5th Army (16th, 17th Corps and 18th Corps), plus a special technical column, and totalled 128,000 men. After 1949, the Second Field Army was stationed in southwest China and controlled five provinces - Yunnan, Guizhou, Sichuan, Xikang, and Tibet.

The 15th Army ("Corps") was transferred to the Second Field Army in 1950.

References

External links 
 http://www.orbat.info/history/volume6/PLA%201st%20and%202nd%20Field%20Armies%201949.htm - Bajwa listing of divisions 1949, probably drawing on William W. Whitson, with Chen-hsia Huang. (1973) The Chinese high command; a history of Communist military politics, 1927–71. Foreword by Lucian W. Pye.

Field armies of the People's Liberation Army
Military units and formations established in 1949